Nafta was an oil distribution chain owned by the Soviet Union but operated abroad.

In the 1920s, a Nafta chain operated in Sweden, before being sold to Gulf Oil in 1937. In the United Kingdom and Belgium a petrol chain was built up in the 1960s, with the British service stations being sold to Q8 in 1987.

NAFTA (UK) was originally called Russian Oil Storage Installations. Another Soviet-owned company in the United Kingdom which shared directors with Nafta was Russian Oil Products Limited (established in 1924 and struck off in 2018).

References

Oil companies of Sweden
Oil and gas companies of Belgium
Defunct oil companies
Oil companies of the Soviet Union
Defunct energy companies of the Soviet Union
Defunct energy companies of Belgium
Defunct energy companies of Sweden
Defunct oil and gas companies of the United Kingdom